Soldiers Delight Natural Environmental Area is a nature reserve near Owings Mills in western Baltimore County, Maryland, U.S. The site is designated both as a Maryland Wildland (1,526 acres) and as a Natural Environment Area (1,900 acres) and is part of the Maryland Wildlands Preservation System. The site's protected status is due to the presence of serpentine soil and over 39 rare, threatened, or endangered plant species along with rare insects, rocks and minerals.

Amenities
 of hiking trails have been blazed at Soldier's Delight. While pets are permitted, equestrians and bicyclists are not, to protect the fragile terrain. A visitor center is open on Saturdays and irregularly during the rest of the week. Attractions there include environmental education programs and a scavenger hunt. Bowhunting is allowed from mid-November to the end of January with appropriate permits.

History
The early colonial records of Maryland describe the area as a hunting ground for Native Americans. In 1693, rangers in the King's service from a nearby garrison patrolled the area calling the land Soldiers Delight. In the 18th century, King George II made gifts of land grants upon Maryland's earliest settlers in what was then Soldiers Delight Hundred.

During the American Civil War, Soldiers Delight was the scene of minor short-term fights between the Maryland Volunteers of the Confederate Army and the regular troops of the Union Army. After the Civil War and the emancipation of people who were enslaved, the great estates of the early families were reduced to many small farms and individual properties.

Geology

The area is mostly underlaid by serpentinite, a rock that contains very little quartz and aluminum-bearing minerals and consists mainly of serpentine. Weathered serpentinite is dissolved rock, transformed into thin, sand- and clay-poor soil which is easily eroded. This creates a land surface which is stony, unfertile and sparsely vegetated and is the reason that the term "serpentine barren" is used to describe these areas. A typical serpentine barren contains bear oak, Virginia pine, Eastern redcedar, grasses and some unique and rare wildflowers.

Serpentine is valued as a decorative building stone, road material, and for this area in Maryland, a historic source of chromium ore. Isaac Tyson, a 19th-century businessman from Baltimore, was one of the first to make the connection between the occurrence of chromite and serpentine barrens. He began mining chromite here in 1827. During the 19th century, Soldiers Delight and the Bare Hills district of Baltimore County were the largest producers of chrome in the world. In Maryland, chromite, a significant accessory mineral in the serpentine, was mined until 1860. Several old mines and quarries are still visible in these serpentine barrens.

Soils
The most common soil is Chrome silt loam, which occupies well-drained areas over serpentinite. In more moist settings Chrome grades to Travilah silt loam. Areas where serpentinite influence is weak or absent are limited in Soldiers Delight, but are easily recognized by their more luxuriant vegetation on the upland Manor loam or the floodplain Hatboro silt loam.

See also
List of wildflowers of Soldiers Delight
List of woody plants of Soldiers Delight
List of graminoids of Soldiers Delight
List of ferns and fern allies of Soldiers Delight
List of lichens of Soldiers Delight
List of parks in the Baltimore–Washington metropolitan area

References

External links

Nature reserves in Maryland
Protected areas of Baltimore County, Maryland
Former mines in the United States
Chromium mines